Leatitia Robinson (born September 30, 1980) an American professional boxer who held the IWBF middleweight title from 2002 to 2004 and the WIBA middleweight title from 2004 to 2006.

Amateur career
Robinson was born in Chicago, Illinois in 1980. She began boxing at age 14 to survive in Cabrini–Green public housing projects. She was involved with numerous street fights growing up, and would often beat up large men in these encounters.

Robinson won her first Golden Gloves competition in 1995. She repeated the performance in 1996, 1997 and 1998, also winning the 1996 Citywide Tournament in Chicago.

On May 31, 1998 in the 156-lb final of the USA Boxing/Everlast National Senior Championships in Anaheim, California, Robinson lost to Evelyn Rodriquez of New York by a 10-2 score. This would be Robinson's only defeat as an amateur boxer.

On April 15, 2000 in the 165-lb final of the USA Boxing/Everlast National Championships in Midland, Texas, Robinson stopped her opponent at 0:51 in the opening round.

On May 7, 2000 in the 75-kg final of the prestigious Feenix Box Cup international tournament in Turku, Finland, Robinson defeated Canadian champion Jennyfer Grenon by a 5-4 margin.

On August 12, 2000 in the 165-lb Open Division Final of the 2000 US National/International Golden Gloves in Augusta, Georgia, Robinson won by a 5-0 decision over Angela Josipovic of Toronto, Canada.
 
Robinson's amateur boxing career ended with a 37-1 record.

Professional career

She made her pro debut on March 23, 2001 in Rosemont, Illinois, winning by a first-round TKO over Aicheria Bell in a scheduled 4 rounder. Bell's pro record fell to 1-4.
 
On December 14, 2002 in Dorchester, Massachusetts, in a battle of former US amateur champions, Robinson TKO'd Dakota Stone in the sixth round to win the vacant IWBF Middleweight title.
 
On February 28, 2004 at Veterans Memorial Field House in Huntington, West Virginia, in a battle between two undefeated and top-ranked fighters, Robinson won the WIBA Middleweight title with a ten-round unanimous (98-92 97-94 99-91) decision over Nikki Eplion.
Former Toughwoman champion Eplion was the favorite of the crowd, estimated at 1,000, and had predicted a third-round KO at the weigh-in. But the ring skills that Robinson had honed in her 37-1 amateur career were too much for Eplion as Robinson constantly beat her to the punch.

On September 24, 2004 at the Philips Arena in Atlanta, Georgia, Robinson won the IBA Continental Light Heavyweight title with a ten-round unanimous decision over Valerie Mahfood. Robinson outboxed Mahfood while punishing her with fast jabs and right hands. Robinson punctuated this performance by knocking down Mahfood in the 10th round.

On February 11, 2005 at the Philips Arena in Atlanta, Georgia, Robinson knocked out Mónica Núñez with only the second punch she threw in the fight, to earn an easy 36-second win and successfully defend her WIBA Middleweight Title.

Professional boxing record

References

External links
 

1980 births
American women boxers
Living people
Boxers from Illinois
World boxing champions
World middleweight boxing champions
People from Chicago
21st-century American women